Delaware's 18th Senate district is one of 21 districts in the Delaware Senate. It has been represented by Republican David Wilson since 2018, succeeding fellow Republican F. Gary Simpson.

Geography
District 18 covers southern Kent County and northern Sussex County, including the communities of Milford, Harrington, Greenwood, Ellendale, Houston, Farmington, Slaughter Beach, and Lincoln.

Like all districts in the state, the 18th Senate district is located entirely within Delaware's at-large congressional district. It overlaps with the 20th, 30th, 33rd, 35th, and 36th districts of the Delaware House of Representatives. It borders the state of Maryland. At over 280 square miles, it is the largest legislative district in the state.

Recent election results
Delaware Senators are elected to staggered four-year terms. Under normal circumstances, the 18th district holds elections in midterm years, except immediately after redistricting, when all seats are up for election regardless of usual cycle.

2018

2014

2012

Federal and statewide results in District 18

References 

18
Kent County, Delaware
Sussex County, Delaware